Samuel Barnett Allen is a Northern Irish lawn and indoor bowler and was born in Ballymena, Northern Ireland on 6 July 1938.

Bowls career
Allen has been bowling since 1966 and has skipped a combined Ireland both indoors and outdoors. He won a Fours bronze medal at the Commonwealth Games for Northern Ireland. Allen also won a gold medal for the Triples in the 1984 World Outdoor Championships in Aberdeen and a Fours gold at the 1988 World Outdoor Championships in Auckland. 
Further success came when he won the 1996 World Outdoor Championships Pairs Gold in Adelaide with Jeremy Henry.

Allen still plays outdoors for the Ballymena Seniors team and his other achievements include winning the British Isles Bowls Championships in 1980  and the 1979 Irish National Bowls Championships singles.

References

Male lawn bowls players from Northern Ireland
1938 births
Living people
Commonwealth Games medallists in lawn bowls
Commonwealth Games silver medallists for Northern Ireland
Commonwealth Games bronze medallists for Northern Ireland
Bowls World Champions
Bowls players at the 1982 Commonwealth Games
Sportspeople from Ballymena
Medallists at the 1982 Commonwealth Games